Saint-Floret is a commune in the Puy-de-Dôme department in Auvergne-Rhône-Alpes in central France.

History
Saint-Floret is a place of passage on the Way of St. James, a leading Catholic pilgrimage route originated in the 9th century.

During the revolutionary period of the National Convention (1792-1795), the commune took the name Roche-la-Couze.

Population

See also
Communes of the Puy-de-Dôme department

References

Communes of Puy-de-Dôme
Plus Beaux Villages de France